The 2013 Brasileiro de Marcas season (officially the 2013 Copa Petrobrás de Marcas) was the third season of the Brasileiro de Marcas. It began on April 7 at Interlagos and ended on December 1 at Curitiba, after sixteen races.

Teams and drivers
All drivers were Brazilian-registered.

Race calendar and results
All races were held in Brazil.

Championship standings
Points were awarded as follows:

Drivers' Championship

Notes:
 * — Driver did not race, but scored points with partner.

Manufacturers' Championship

Teams' Championship

References

External links
  

Marcas
Brasileiro de Marcas seasons